This is the discography for English-American hip hop musician Slick Rick. It includes 4 studio albums and 17 singles, including 8 as a featured artist.

Albums

Studio albums

Singles

As lead artist

As featured artist

Guest appearances 

1986: "The Show (Oh My God! Remix)" (from the Doug E Fresh album Oh My God!)
1989: "If I'm Not Your Lover (12" remix from the Al B. Sure! album In Effect Mode)
1991: "Get Bizzy" (from the Greyson & Jaysun album Sweatin' Me Wet)
1994: "Let's All Get Down" (from the Nice & Smooth album Jewel of the Nile)
1994: "Move On..." & "The Show Theme" (from the compilation The Show)
1996: I Like & "Bounce 2 This" Feat. DJ Quik (From the Montell Jordan album More)
1996: "Got To Give It Up" (from the Aaliyah album One in a Million)
1997: "Just Another Case" (from the CRU album Da Dirty 30)
1997: "Mona Lisa" (from the Funkmaster Flex mixtape The Mix Tape, Vol. II)
1998: "Fresh" (from the Jermaine Dupri album Life In 1472)
1998: "Freestyle Over "Mona Lisa" (from the Funkmaster Flex mixtape The Mix Tape, Vol. III)
1998: "Faces Of Def" (bonus track on Jayo Felony's Whatcha Gonna Do)
1998: "Unify" (from the Kid Capri album Soundtrack to the Streets)
1998: "Impress the Kid" (from the compilation album Rush Hour (soundtrack))
1998: "Pimpin' Ain't Easy" (from WWF Aggression with Ice-T & Charles Wright)
1999: "If We Give You A Chance" (from the Warren G album I Want It All)
1999: "Night Riders" (from the Rahzel album Make The Music 2000)
1999: "So Fresh" (from the Will Smith album Willennium)
1999: "Don't Come My Way" (from the Whiteboys soundtrack with Common)
1999: "Da Art of Storytellin' (Pt. 1)" (from the OutKast album Aquemini)
1999: "I Sparkle" (from the Wild Wild West (soundtrack))
2000: "Why Not" (from the Erick Sermon album Def Squad Presents Erick Onasis)
2001: "What We Do (For Love)" (from the De La Soul album AOI: Bionix)
2001: "Pie"  (from WWF The Music, Vol. 5 with The Rock)
2001: "Girls, Girls, Girls" (from the Jay-Z album The Blueprint)
2001: "Guidance Counselor"(from the Little-T And One Track Mike album Fome Is Dape)
2001: "The World Is Yours" with Macy Gray (from the compilation album Rush Hour 2 (soundtrack))
2001: "Hey Young World, Part 2" (from the Macy Gray album The Id)
2002: "Women Lose Weight"  (from the Morcheeba album Charango)
2004: "The Return (Remix)" (from the Jay-Z/R. Kelly album Unfinished Business)
2004: "Trouble on the Westside" (from the Tony Touch album The Piece Maker 2)
2005: Performs live for Vox Entertainment @ Club Strata NYC
2005: "The Sun" (from the Ghostface Killah album Put It on the Line)
2005: "The Fix" with Doug E. Fresh (from the Jordan Knight album The Fix (EP))
2005: "Irresistible Delicious" (from the Missy Elliott album The Cookbook)
2006: "Vows" (from the Juggaknots album Use Your Confusion)
2007: "Hip Hop Police" (from the Chamillionaire album Ultimate Victory)
2008: "VH1 Hip Hop Honors" (Honoree)
2009: "Y.O.U." (from the Asher Roth album Asleep in the Bread Aisle - UK bonus track)
2009: "Auditorium" (from the Mos Def album The Ecstatic)
2009: "We Will Rob You" (from the Raekwon album Only Built 4 Cuban Linx... Pt. II)
2009: "Family Jewels" (from the Dynas album The Apartment)
2010: "I Wanna Rock Freestyle"
2010: "Rock The Bells 2010" (from album The Great Adventures of Slick Rick)
2011: "Need Some Bad" (from The Sitter soundtrack)
2018: "Giving Me Life" (from Mariah Carey album Caution)
2019: "So Misinformed" (from Snoop Dogg's album I Wanna Thank Me)
2020: "Ocean Prime", "Good Night" (from the Westside Gunn album Who Made the Sunshine)
2021: "Hey Auntie" (from the IDK album USee4Yourself)

Filmography

Other media 
Cameo in Ludacris's 2005 music video for the song "Number One Spot"
Cameo in Busta Rhymes' 2006 music video for the song "New York Shit" featuring Swizz Beatz
Himself in the video game Def Jam: Fight for NY

Notes

References 

Discographies of American artists
Hip hop discographies